Neth Saknarong; is a Thai Muay Thai fighter who competed in the 1970s.

Biography and career
Neth started training in Muay Thai at the age of 14 with a trainer in his native village of Pang Khon. Neth then joined the Therdkiatpitak camp where he became a young phenom in the northeast regions of Thailand by winning 30 fights in a row. At 17 years old Neth made his debut in Bangkok and joined the Saknarong camp.

During the 1970s Neth became a renowned fighter with powerful weapons from the southpaw stance. He was ranked highly in both the Rajadamnern and Lumpinee Stadiums and defeated many notable Thai champions of his era such as Posai Sitiboonlert, Pudpadnoi Worawut, Poot Lorlek, Khunponnoi Kiatsuriya, Vicharnnoi Porntawee. Neth also traveled to Los Angeles where he defeated the American WKA world champion Earnest Hart Jr by knockout in 1977.

Neth retired from the Bangkok circuit in 1978 following a loss to Satanfah Sor.Prateep. In 1988 He was invited to compete in Paris where he defeated european champion Mustapha Benatia by knockout, Neth then settled in France where he has been a teacher for over 30 years.

Muay Thai record

|-  bgcolor="#fbb"
| 1988-06-11 || Loss ||align=left| Ivan Hippolyte|| Champions in Action || Amsterdam, Netherlands || TKO (Punches) || 2 || 

|-  style="background:#cfc;"
| 1988-02-26 || Win ||align=left| Mustapha Benatia || Trophée des Champions || Paris, France || KO ||  ||

|- style="text-align:center; background:#fbb;"
|1978-09-30
|Loss
| align="left" | Satanfah Sor.Prateep
|Lumpinee Stadium
|Bangkok, Thailand
|TKO
|2
|

|-  style="background:#fbb;"
| 1977-08-25 || Loss||align=left| Vicharnnoi Porntawee ||  || Bangkok, Thailand || Decision || 5 || 3:00

|-  style="background:#fbb;"
| 1977-06-02 || Loss ||align=left| Ruengsak Porntawee || Rajadamnern Stadium || Bangkok, Thailand || Decision || 5 ||3:00

|-  style="background:#cfc;"
| 1977-03-12 || Win ||align=left| Earnest Hart Jr || WKA || Los Angeles, US || KO (Left cross) || 5 ||

|-  style="background:#fbb;"
| ? || Loss ||align=left| Santi Rekchai ||  || Bangkok, Thailand || Decision || 5 ||3:00

|-  style="background:#cfc;"
| 1976-11-11 || Win ||align=left| Vicharnnoi Porntawee || Rajadamnern Stadium || Bangkok, Thailand || Decision || 5 || 3:00

|-  style="background:#fbb;"
| 1976-10-05 || Loss ||align=left| Posai Sitiboonlert || Lumpinee Stadium || Bangkok, Thailand || Decision || 5 || 3:00

|-  style="background:#c5d2ea;"
| 1976-08-31 || Draw||align=left| Posai Sitiboonlert || Lumpinee Stadium || Bangkok, Thailand || Decision || 5 || 3:00

|-  style="background:#cfc;"
| 1976-06-16 ||Win||align=left| Khunponnoi Kiatsuriya || Rajadamnern Stadium || Bangkok, Thailand || Decision || 5 || 3:00

|-  style="background:#fbb;"
| 1976-05-14 || Loss||align=left| Poot Lorlek || Rajadamnern Stadium || Bangkok, Thailand || Decision || 5 || 3:00

|-  style="background:#cfc;"
| 1976-03-25 ||Win||align=left| Poot Lorlek || Rajadamnern Stadium || Bangkok, Thailand || Decision || 5 || 3:00

|-  style="background:#cfc;"
| 1976-02-26 || Win ||align=left| Pudpadnoi Worawut || Rajadamnern Stadium || Bangkok, Thailand || Decision || 5 || 3:00

|-  style="background:#cfc;"
| 1976-01-20 || Win||align=left| Posai Sitiboonlert || Lumpinee Stadium || Bangkok, Thailand || Decision || 5 || 3:00

|-  style="background:#fbb;"
| 1975-11-12 || Loss ||align=left| Vicharnnoi Porntawee || Rajadamnern Stadium || Bangkok, Thailand || Decision || 5 || 3:00

|-  style="background:#fbb;"
| 1975-09-12 || Loss ||align=left| Pudpadnoi Worawut || Lumpinee Stadium || Bangkok, Thailand || Decision || 5 || 3:00

|-  style="background:#cfc;"
| 1975-07-25 || Win ||align=left| Weerachat Sordaeng || Lumpinee Stadium || Bangkok, Thailand || Decision || 5 || 3:00

|-  style="background:#cfc;"
| 1975-06-02 || Win ||align=left| Siprae Duagnprateep || Rajadamnern Stadium || Bangkok, Thailand || Decision || 5 || 3:00

|-  style="background:#cfc;"
| 1975-04-03 || Win ||align=left| Wanarong Peeramit || Rajadamnern Stadium || Bangkok, Thailand || Decision || 5 || 3:00

|-  style="background:#cfc;"
| 1975-02-13 || Win ||align=left| Minoru ||  || Bangkok, Thailand || KO|| 2|| 

|-  style="background:#fbb;"
| 1974-10-11 || Loss||align=left| Chalermphon Sor.Tha-it || || Bangkok, Thailand || Decision || 5 || 3:00 

|-  style="background:#c5d2ea;"
| 1974-09-05 || Draw ||align=left| Chalermphon Sor.Tha-it || Rajadamnern Stadium || Bangkok, Thailand || Decision || 5 || 3:00

|-  style="background:#fbb;"
| 1974– || Loss||align=left| Chalermphon Sor.Tha-it ||  || Bangkok, Thailand || Decision || 5 || 3:00 

|-  style="background:#fbb;"
| 1974-04-18 || Loss||align=left| Muangchon Jirapan || Rajadamnern Stadium || Bangkok, Thailand || Decision || 5 || 3:00 

|-  style="background:#cfc;"
| 1974-03-28 || Win||align=left| Yia Lee-lee || Kung Fu vs Muay Thai, Rajadamnern Stadium || Bangkok, Thailand || KO (Left hook) || 1 || 

|-  style="background:#cfc;"
| 1974-03-01 || Win||align=left| Sommai Ekayothin || Lumpinee Stadium || Bangkok, Thailand || Decision || 5 || 3:00

|-  style="background:#cfc;"
| 1973– || Win ||align=left| Jomtap Sakprasong || Rajadamnern Stadium || Bangkok, Thailand || Decision || 5 || 3:00

|-
| colspan=9 | Legend:

See more
List of Muay Thai practitioners

References

1954 births
Living people
Neth Saknarong
Neth Saknarong